The Leyte tree frog (Philautus leitensis)  is a species of frog in the family Rhacophoridae.
It is endemic to the Philippines.

Its natural habitats are subtropical or tropical moist lowland forests and subtropical or tropical moist montane forests.
It is threatened by habitat loss.

References

Philautus
Endemic fauna of the Philippines
Fauna of Leyte
Amphibians of the Philippines
Amphibians described in 1897
Taxonomy articles created by Polbot